Acarospora Peak is a peak  northeast of, and only slightly below the elevation of Mount Czegka, located at the southwest end of Watson Escarpment. It was mapped by the United States Geological Survey (USGS) from surveys and U.S. Navy air photos between 1960 and 1964. Named by New Zealand Antarctic Place-Names Committee (NZ-APC) on suggestion of New Zealand Geological Survey Antarctic Expedition (NZGSAE) Scott Glacier Party, 1969–70, because the lichen Acarospora emergens Dodge was found on the peak.

References 

Mountains of Marie Byrd Land